The Murch Family House is a historic house on Calderwood Neck in Vinalhaven, Maine.  Built in 1855, it is the only granite house in a community long known for its granite quarries, and one of a relatively small number of documented stone houses in the state.  It was listed on the National Register of Historic Places in 1993.

Description and history
The town of Vinalhaven occupies an eponymous island in Penobscot Bay, located on the central coast of Maine.  The island has many deep indentations, two of which define its northeastern lobe, which is known as Calderwood Neck.  The Murch House is located on the southeastern part of Calderwood Neck, overlooking the channel that separates it from Penobscot Island.  The house is a -story Cape style structure, built out of ashlar granite blocks, and covered by a gabled roof.  The front facade is three bays wide, with a pair of sash windows flanking the entrance, offset to the right side of the facade.  The interior is divided into four rooms on the ground floor, with a central chimney.  Stairs leading up to the attic space are located along the north wall, in the chamber accessed from the main entrance.  Also on the property is a 19th-century barn.  It is long rectangular timber-frame structure, with a saltbox profile, that is set on sloping terrain with a fully exposed granite block foundation at the rear.

Built about 1855, the house is the only documented granite dwelling on the island, which was well known in the 19th century for its granite.  At the time of its construction, the quarries were just beginning to be exploited.  This house was built by William Murch, a local mason, using stone quarried from a nearby outcrop.  The house was owned for many years by members of the Murch family, who were typically fishermen also engage in subsistence-level farming.

See also
National Register of Historic Places listings in Knox County, Maine
Other stone houses in Maine:
Stone House (Bridgton, Maine)
Nelson Family Farm
Theodore Jellison House

References

Houses on the National Register of Historic Places in Maine
National Register of Historic Places in Knox County, Maine
Greek Revival architecture in Maine
Houses completed in 1855
Houses in Knox County, Maine
Vinalhaven, Maine